Cosmin Nicolae Mărginean (born 21 November 1978) is a Romanian former football player. In his career Mărginean played for Oțelul Galați, Unirea Urziceni, Delta Tulcea and Kazakh club Okzhetpes.

References

 
 

1978 births
Living people
People from Câmpia Turzii
Romanian footballers
Association football midfielders
Liga I players
ASC Oțelul Galați players
FC Unirea Urziceni players
Liga II players
FC Delta Dobrogea Tulcea players
Kazakhstan Premier League players
FC Okzhetpes players
Romanian expatriate footballers
Romanian expatriate sportspeople in Kazakhstan
Expatriate footballers in Kazakhstan